The Michigan High School Athletic Association Southeastern Conference (MHSAA SEC) is a high school sports conference composed of schools (all public) in three different counties in the state of Michigan.  The SEC is split into two divisions, Red and White, based on enrollment.  Currently, there are 14 members of the SEC.

Member schools

Current members

Former members

Membership timeline

History
The SEC was formed by three schools from the disbanding Washtenaw County League (Chelsea, Dexter, and Saline), two from the Huron League (Dundee and Ypsilanti Lincoln), and independent South Lyon. The league expanded to eight by 1969, with Novi joining from the Lakeland Conference that year, and Milan joining from the Huron in 1967. In 1973 Dundee left for the Michigan-Ohio Border Conference, and was replaced by Brighton, joining from the Wayne-Oakland League. 1979 also brought major change to the conference, as Brighton, Novi, and South Lyon left for the Kensington Valley Conference. Parma Western joined that year, having been independent since leaving the Cascades Conference in 1976. Tecumseh left the Huron League to join the Southeastern in 1980, bringing the conference to seven members. Western returned to the Cascades Conference in 1983, as their replacement, Pinckney, left the Kensington Valley Conference in 1984.

The league was stable until 2000, when Milan and Pinckney left for the Huron League and Kensington Valley Conference, respectively. Bedford joined from the Great Lakes League, and were joined by two schools that had been independent since the South Central Conference folded in 1996 (Adrian and Ann Arbor Pioneer). The conference now split into Red and White divisions: Adrian, Bedford, Pioneer, and Saline made up the Red, and the White consisted of Chelsea, Dexter, Lincoln, and Tecumseh. The Southeastern scrapped the divisional format in 2006 in anticipation of another former South Central school joining that next year, Ann Arbor Huron. The conference reintroduced divisions in 2009, the Red being formed by Bedford, Huron, Pioneer, Saline, and two new members, new school Ann Arbor Skyline and Monroe, who left the Michigan Mega Conference. The White Division consisted of Adrian, Chelsea, Dexter, Lincoln, Tecumseh, and another school leaving the Michigan Mega, Ypsilanti.

Ypsilanti had changed their name from Braves to Phoenix in 2010, after phasing out Native American mascots since the 1990s. The school district consolidated with Ypsilanti Willow Run in 2013, resulting in not only another mascot change (Grizzlies), but a color change from Purple and Gold to Black and Gold. Pinckney rejoined the conference in 2017 after leaving the Kensington Lakes Activities Association, while Jackson joined in 2018 coming from the Capital Area Activities Conference. Both schools were put into the White division; however, this has left an imbalance in the number of schools in each division. In 2020 Ypsi moved to the red division. In 2021 Ypsi moved back to the white, and Dexter and Lincoln moved to the red. This has left another imbalance in the divisions, this time with the red having 2 more members than the white.

References

Michigan high school sports conferences
High school sports conferences and leagues in the United States